Panthera youngi is a fossil cat species that was described in 1934; fossil remains of this cat were excavated in a Sinanthropus formation in Choukoutien, northeastern China. Upper and lower jaws excavated in Japan's Yamaguchi Prefecture were also attributed to this species.
It is estimated to have lived about 350,000 years ago in the Pleistocene epoch. It was suggested that it was conspecific with Panthera atrox and P. spelaea due to their extensive similarities. Some dental similarities were also noted with the older P. fossilis, however, Panthera youngi showed more derived features.

References

youngi
Prehistoric animals of China
youngi
Fossil taxa described in 1934